The Bavarian Film Awards have been awarded annually since 1979 by the state government of Bavaria in Germany. They are among the most highly regarded awards for filmmaking achievement in Germany. There are several categories for actors and actresses.

Table of winners

Best Actor

1983 Gustl Bayrhammer, Joachim Bernhard
1985 Jürgen Prochnow
1988 Uwe Bohm, Klaus Maria Brandauer
1989 Ulrich Mühe
1990 Manfred Krug
1992 Jürgen Vogel, Kai Wiesinger
1994 Herbert Knaup, Joachim Król
1995 Götz George
1996 Heiner Lauterbach
1997 Michael Mendl, Kai Wiesinger
1998 August Diehl, Ulrich Matthes
1999 Uwe Ochsenknecht
2000 Benno Fürmann
2001 Ulrich Noethen
2002 Axel Prahl
2003 Christian Ulmen
2004 Bruno Ganz
2005 Ulrich Mühe
2006 Jürgen Vogel
2007 Elmar Wepper
2008 Ulrich Tukur
2009 Mark Waschke
2010 Edgar Selge
2011 Milan Peschel
2012 Tom Schilling
2013 Tobias Moretti
2014 Alexander Fehling
2015 Burghart Klaußner
2016 Jörg Schüttauf
2017 David Kross and Frederick Lau
2018 Alexander Scheer
2019 Bjarne Mädel and Lars Eidinger

Best Supporting Actor
 1999 Gottfried John

Best New Actor

1988 Werner Stocker
1989 Jürgen Vogel
1991 Hansa Czypionka
1993 André Eisermann
1996 Jan Josef Liefers
1999 Florian Lukas
2000 Tom Schilling, Robert Stadlober
2001 Daniel Brühl
2002 Barnaby Metschurat
2004 Matthias Schweighöfer
2005 Max Riemelt
2009 Friedrich Mücke
2010 Jacob Matschenz, Burak Yiğit
2012 Sabin Tambrea
2013 Jonas Nay
2014 Louis Hofmann
2015 Max von der Groeben, Aram Arami, Lucas Reiber
2016 Jannis Niewöhner
2017 Jonas Dassler
2018 Max Hubacher
2019 Jan Bülow

Best Actress

1979 Birgit Doll
1980 Birgit Doll
1981 Eva Mattes
1982 Edith Clever
1983 Lena Stolze
1984 Marita Breuer
1985 Christiane Hörbiger
1987 Carola Höhn, Marianne Hoppe, Camilla Horn, Ortrud von der Recke, Fee von Reichlin, Marika Rökk, Rose Renée Roth
1988 Ayse Romey
1989 Claudia Messner
1990 Franziska Walser
1993 Katja Riemann
1994 Meret Becker, Nina Petri, Maria Schrader
1995 Katja Riemann
1996 Corinna Harfouch
1997 Barbara Sukowa
1998 Juliane Köhler, Maria Schrader
1999 Martina Gedeck
2000 Hannelore Elsner
2001 Karoline Eichhorn
2002 Marie Bäumer
2003 Johanna Gastdorf
2004 Jessica Schwarz
2005 Nina Hoss
2006 Monica Bleibtreu, Katharina Thalbach
2007 Martina Gedeck
2008 Ursula Werner
2009 Barbara Sukowa
2010 Sophie Rois
2011 Bettina Mittendorfer, Steffi Kühnert
2012 Barbara Sukowa
2013 Brigitte Hobmeier
2014 Katharina Marie Schubert
2015 Rosalie Thomass
2016 Sandra Hüller
2017 Diane Kruger
2018 Marie Bäumer
2019 Anne Ratte-Polle

Best Supporting Actress
 1999 Marita Marschall
 2002 Margit Carstensen

Best New Actress

1983 Susanne Herlet, Anja Jaenicke
1988 Dana Vávrová
1989 Anica Dobra
1995 Heike Makatsch, Franka Potente
1996 Christiane Paul
1997 Catherine Flemming
2000 Fritzi Haberlandt
2001 Chiara Schoras
2004 Julia Jentsch
2005 Sandra Hüller
2006 Hannah Herzsprung
2007 Elinor Lüdde, Petra Schmidt-Schaller
2008 Karoline Herfurth
2009 Katharina Schüttler
2010 Paula Beer
2011 Jella Haase
2012 Lisa Brand
2013 Liv Lisa Fries
2014 Jasna Fritzi Bauer
2015 Jella Haase, Anna Lena Klenke, Gizem Emre
2016 Lea van Acken
2017 Verena Altenberger
2018 Svenja Jung
2019 Luna Wedler

References
https://www.stmd.bayern.de/wp-content/uploads/2020/08/Bayerische-Filmpreisträger-bis-2020.pdf

Film awards for lead actor
Film awards for lead actress
Bavarian film awards